Johnes Mwashushe Mwaruma is a Kenyan politician. He is currently the senator of Taita Taveta County. He is a member of Orange Democratic Movement.

References 

Living people
Orange Democratic Movement politicians
Members of the Senate of Kenya
Year of birth missing (living people)